Cordelia Fine (born 1975) is a Canadian-born British philosopher of science, psychologist and writer. She is a full professor in the History and Philosophy of Science programme at the University of Melbourne, Australia. Fine has written three popular science books on the topics of social cognition, neuroscience, and the popular myths of sex differences. Her latest book, Testosterone Rex, won the Royal Society Science Book Prize, 2017. She has authored several academic book chapters and numerous academic publications. Fine is also noted for coining the term 'neurosexism'.

As a science communicator, Fine has given many public and keynote lectures across the education, business, academic and public sectors.

Fine has also written for The New York Times, Scientific American, New Scientist, The Psychologist, The Guardian, and The Monthly, among others, and has reviewed books for the Financial Times and The Wall Street Journal.

In April 2018, Cordelia Fine was awarded the Edinburgh Medal. This medal is awarded to "men and women of science and technology whose professional achievements are judged to have made a significant contribution to the understanding and well-being of humanity."

Early life and education 
Cordelia Fine born in Toronto, the daughter of writer Anne Fine and Kit Fine, a philosopher. She was educated at St George's School for Girls in Edinburgh, Scotland. She was awarded a bachelor's degree in Experimental Psychology with first-class honours from Oxford University, a Master of Philosophy in Criminology from Cambridge University, and a PhD in Psychology from University College London.

Career 
Since completing her PhD, Cordelia Fine has undertaken research at the School of Philosophy & Bioethics at Monash University, at the Centre for Applied Philosophy & Public Ethics at the Australian National University, and at the Centre for Agency, Values & Ethics (CAVE) at Macquarie University.

From 2012 to 2016, she was an ARC Future Fellow at the Melbourne School of Psychological Sciences.

She was also an Associate Professor in the Melbourne Business School, at the University of Melbourne until 2016. She is currently a Professor in the School of Historical and Philosophical Studies at the University of Melbourne, Australia

Books 
Fine's first book, A Mind of Its Own, synthesizes a large amount of cognitive research to show that the mind often gives a distorted picture of reality.

Her second book, Delusions of Gender, argues that conclusions that science has shown that men's and women's brains are intrinsically different in ways that explain the gender status quo are premature and often based on flawed methods and unexamined assumptions. She also challenges the common assumption that a gender-egalitarian society means that differences in social outcomes and interests must be due to biology. "With still such different contexts and circumstances for men and women, it's simply not possible to compare the choices they make and draw confident conclusions about the sexes' different inner natures." Fine's approach to gender has been criticised by those who think it behaviourist, and for not accounting for what psychiatry terms gender identity disorders. However, as Fine pointed out in The Psychologist, the book is concerned with scientific evidence presented as support for the idea that males and females are, on average, 'hardwired' to 'systemise' versus 'empathise', rather than the question of the extent to which core gender identity is 'hardwired'; and that she does not subscribe to a behaviourist or social determinist view of development, but rather "one in which the developmental path is constructed, step by step, out of the continuous and dynamic interaction between brain, genes and environment."

Ben Barres, a Professor of Neurobiology at Stanford University, wrote in a review of the book for PLOS Biology that Fine's "analysis of this data should be required reading for every neurobiology student, if not every human being." The neuroscientists Margaret McCarthy and Gregory Ball have said that Fine presents a one-sided picture of the study of sex differences, and that Delusions of Gender threatened to "severely hamper" progress in this field. However, neuroscientists Geert de Vries and Nancy Forger of the Neuroscience Institute at Georgia State University cite the work of Fine and colleagues in noting that "unsubstantiated claims about the nature and function of neural sex differences continue to be made and such claims may do serious harm". Together with Barnard College sociomedical scientist Rebecca Jordan-Young, Fine has rejected the claim, based on quotations of her criticisms of popular misrepresentations of science, that she is "anti-sex differences". Fine and Jordan-Young, with other co-authors, have published recommendations and guidelines for improving the quality of scientific investigations of sex/gender differences in research.

Fine's third book, Testosterone Rex, critiques an account of sex differences and their evolutionary, neural and hormonal basis that is the prominent view in the scientific literature and research. In 2017, Testosterone Rex won the prestigious Royal Society Science Books Prize. Harriet Hall, who often critiques alternative medicine and quackery for their lack of a scientific basis, argued in the Skeptical Inquirer: "Cordelia Fine's book provides compelling evidence that men and women aren't really very different other than in their anatomy. There is no such thing as a 'male brain' or a 'female brain'. There are no essential male or female natures but rather an individualized mosaic of features. Testosterone isn't very important. Biology can't be used to explain or excuse societal inequalities."

Awards and commendations

Testosterone Rex 
The Royal Society Insight Investment Science Book Prize, 2017

Delusions of Gender 
Shortlisted for the Victorian Premier's Literary Award for non-fiction 2011.
Shortlisted for the Best Book of Ideas Prize 2011.
Shortlisted for the John Llewellyn Rhys Prize 2010.
Shortlisted by The Washington Post for 2010 Best Non-Fiction Book of the Year
Shortlisted for the 2013 Warwick Prize for Writing.
Evening Standard 2010 book of the year
Guardian 2010 book of the year.
Huffington Post "22 books women think men should read" list

A Mind of Its Own 
One of twelve books long-listed for the UK Royal Society Science Prize 2007

Selected bibliography

Books

Journal articles 

 
 
 
 
 
 
See also: 
 
 
 
 
 
 
 *

References

External links 
 
 

1975 births
People educated at St George's School, Edinburgh
Alumni of the University of Oxford
Alumni of the University of Cambridge
Alumni of University College London
British emigrants to Australia
British non-fiction writers
British psychologists
British technology writers
Living people
Academic staff of the University of Melbourne
Writers from Toronto
Human sex difference researchers
University of Melbourne women